Tanja Šmid (born 29 April 1990 in Kranj) is a Slovenian swimmer. At the 2012 Summer Olympics, she competed in the women's 200 metre breaststroke, finishing in 33rd place overall in the heats, failing to qualify for the semifinals.

References

External links
 
 
 

1990 births
Living people
Slovenian female swimmers
Female breaststroke swimmers
Olympic swimmers of Slovenia
Swimmers at the 2012 Summer Olympics
Mediterranean Games bronze medalists for Slovenia
Mediterranean Games medalists in swimming
Swimmers at the 2013 Mediterranean Games
Sportspeople from Kranj